Paul Bertelson (1926–2008),  was an internationally recognized experimental cognitive psychologist.

Background and academic achievements
Graduated from the Solvay Business School in 1949 and from the Psychology School in 1953, both at Université libre de Bruxelles (ULB), Paul Bertelson obtained a PhD grant from the Belgian National Fund for Scientific Research (FNRS) at the Laboratory of Psychology. From 1955 to 1959 he was Assistant of Professor André Ombredane, obtaining his PhD in Psychology in 1959. He became Professor in 1962 (teaching Experimental psychology and Cognitive psychology) and Emeritus Professor in 1990.
At ULB, Paul Bertelson created the Laboratory of Experimental Psychology in 1964, being its Head until 1990. He was President of the Faculty of Psychological and Pedagogical Sciences from 1977 to 1980. He acted as President of the XXVth International Congress of Psychology (Brussels, 1992) and was one of the founding members of the European Training Program in Brain and Behaviour Research in 1969. He was also member of the steering Committees of the Attention and Performance Seminars and of the Annual Bressanone meetings in Cognitive Neuropsychology. In 1985, Paul Bertelson and four other leading figures in the field of Cognitive Psychology (Alan Baddeley, Janet Jackson, John Michon, and Wolfgang Prinz) founded the European Society for Cognitive Psychology (ESCOP). He acted as President (1991–92) and Vice-president (1993–94) of ESCOP. To honor his contributions to the field, the board of ESCOP decided to award a prestigious prize every two years to a young and outstanding scientist, naming the award the “Paul Bertelson award”.

Scientific achievements

At the beginning of his career, he stayed for one year (1957) at the M.R.C. Applied Psychology Research Unit in Cambridge where he interacted with Poulton, Donald Broadbent and others. This led him to take part in the study of “skills”, i.e. of the processes involved in reaction time situations, based on the idea (expressed in his PhD thesis) that the comprehension of the mechanisms of complex abilities can be reached by studying systematically how elementary reactions are integrated in a continuous activity. He thus manipulated sequential dependencies to examine the preparation to react as this is limited by uncertainty concerning both the nature and the moment of the signal occurrence. The demonstration of a repetition effect was one of his most important results. Methodologically, the “Bertelson’s repetition effect” was indeed an important contribution to later priming studies. In this domain, Bertelson also contributed to better understand the refractoriness or central intermittence phenomenon.
 In the early 1970s, Paul Bertelson, while training PhD students who became his close collaborators, channeled his research into three new main directions: (1) on perception, with a detailed program to understand the spatial and temporal aspects of audiovisual interactions (Monique Radeau), (2) on cognitive neuropsychology, mainly concerning hemispheric differences and the role of spatial attention in perceptual laterality effects (José Morais); and (3) on cognitive psycholinguistics, in particular the role of phonemic awareness in learning to read, compared to other forms of phonological awareness (Jesus Alegria, José Morais, Alain Content, Régine Kolinsky); and the processing of written words, including in braille reading (Daniel Holender, Philippe Mousty). Bertelson also strongly encouraged the development by Jesus Alegria and Jacqueline Leybaert, in collaboration with his colleague Olivier Périer, of a fourth research line, on the role of phonology in literacy processes in deaf children. 
In all these programs, important scientific accomplishments have been performed, turning Paul Bertelson’s Laboratoire de Pychologie expérimentale one of the most influential centers of experimental cognitive psychology in Europe until less than ten years ago. Now formally extinguished, this Laboratory was the precursor, and its still active researchers a significant force, of the present ULB’s Center for Research in Cognition and Neurosciences (CRCN), itself one component of the ULB Neuroscience Institute (UNI).
In the last years of his life, Paul Bertelson has been also associated to Tilburg University where he strongly collaborated with Beatrice de Gelder and Jean Vroomen both on audiovisual interactions (mainly in a neuropsychological perspective) and on psycholinguistic issues.

Main publications

References

Cognitive psychologists
1926 births
2008 deaths
Free University of Brussels (1834–1969) alumni